This is a list of flag bearers who have represented Norway at the Olympics.

Flag bearers carry the national flag of their country at the opening ceremony of the Olympic Games.

See also
Norway at the Olympics

References

Norway at the Olympics
Norway
Olympic flagbearers